Sandiford is a rural locality in the Mackay Region, Queensland, Australia. In the  Sandiford had a population of 175 people.

History 
Sandiford Provisional School opened on 5 October 1908.  On 1 January 1909 it became Sandiford State School. It closed on 23 December 1992. 

In the  Sandiford had a population of 175 people.

References 

Mackay Region
Localities in Queensland